Ozyorsk (until 1938 ; ; ; from 1938 to 1946 ) is a town and the administrative center of Ozyorsky District in Kaliningrad Oblast, Russia, located on the Angrapa River near the border with the Polish Warmian-Masurian Voivodeship,  southeast of Kaliningrad, the administrative center of the oblast. Population:

History

Before the arrival of the Teutonic Order, the river valley was here settled by the Nadruvians, as evidenced by traces of settlements and fortifications found in the area. Teutonic overlordship was established around 1388, but the town is mentioned for the first time in written sources in 1539 as Darkyem. In 1454, the region was incorporated by King Casimir IV Jagiellon to the Kingdom of Poland upon the request of the anti-Teutonic Prussian Confederation. After the subsequent Thirteen Years' War, since 1466, it formed part of Poland as a fief held by the Teutonic Order, and after 1525 it was located in Ducal Prussia, a vassal duchy of Poland. It was settled by Lithuanian, Polish and German colonists. A first church was built in 1615. From 1701, it formed part of the Kingdom of Prussia. The settlement remained a village until 1724, when it received city rights by Frederick William I of Prussia. Soon afterwards, the town plan was revised with a market square and a new grid plan. An influx of immigrants followed (in 1725, 103 of the 742 registered inhabitants came from Salzburg) and craft production of leather and cloth established in the town. In the 19th century the industry had to close due to competition from more efficient industries in western Germany.

Nine annual fairs were organized in the town in the late 19th century. Due to its location on the Angrapa River, a power station established in the watermill was already in 1880 able to produce electrical light for the town. The town was heavily damaged during fighting in World War I but rebuilt after garden city ideals following the war, with financial support from the city of Dresden.

From 1871 to 1945 the town was part of Germany, within which it was administratively located in the province of East Prussia. Two labour camps of the Reich Labour Service were operated in the town under Nazi Germany. It was captured by the 3rd Belorussian Front of the Red Army on 23 January 1945 in the course of the East Prussian offensive. After Germany's defeat in World War II, the town initially passed to Poland under its historic Polish name Darkiejmy, however, it was soon annexed by the Soviet Union. Its German populace was expelled in accordance to the Potsdam Agreement. It was renamed as Ozyorsk on 7 September 1946.

In 1970, the Department of Printed Circuits was established as a branch of the Radiotechnical Measuring Instruments Factory in Vilnius.

Administrative and municipal status
Within the framework of administrative divisions, Ozyorsk serves as the administrative center of Ozyorsky District. As an administrative division, it is incorporated (together with the rural locality Ushakovo) within Ozyorsky District as the town of district significance of Ozyorsk.

Within the framework of municipal divisions, since June 11, 2014, the territories of the town of district significance of Ozyorsk and of three rural okrugs of Ozyorsky District are incorporated as Ozyorsky Urban Okrug. Before that, the town of district significance was incorporated within Ozyorsky Municipal District as Ozyorskoye Urban Settlement.

Culture
The Central Library is the town's main public library. The Jan Kochanowski Association of Polish Culture is a cultural institution of the local Polish community, which also offers teaching of Polish language, history, geography and literature.

Notable residents
Gustav Bauer (1870–1944), politician and Chancellor of Germany in 1919-1920
 Heinz Ziegler (1894–1972), Wehrmacht general
 Sergei Skripal (born 23 June 1951),  former Russian military intelligence officer who acted as a double agent for the UK's intelligence services during the 1990s and early 2000s.

References

Notes

Sources

Cities and towns in Kaliningrad Oblast
Ozyorsky District, Kaliningrad Oblast